Psyclapse may refer to:
Psyclapse (company), a subsidiary of Psygnosis
Psyclapse (Megagame), a vaporware "Megagame" planned by Imagine Software in the 1980s